Polynoncus longitarsis is a species of hide beetle in the subfamily Omorginae found in Chile and Argentina.

References

longitarsis
Beetles described in 1872
Insects of South America